Blair Thisbe Bowden,  ( Williams; 7 June 1916 – 30 September 1981) was an Australian naval officer who served as director of the Women's Royal Australian Naval Service (WRANS).

Born in Dunedin, New Zealand, Bowden attended Christchurch Girls High School and received an arts degree from Canterbury University College before moving to Australia and enlisting in 1943. She was a member of the first training course for potential female officers, receiving the rank of third officer. By the end of the Second World War she had been promoted to first officer and was "senior serving WRANS officer in the New South Wales command". The WRANS was disbanded in the immediate post-war period, but on its reformation in 1950 Bowden was appointed as its director, a position she held until 1954. She then moved to London and worked at the Australian High Commission, receiving the British Empire Medal in 1970.

References

|-

1916 births
1981 deaths
Royal Australian Navy personnel of World War II
Australian recipients of the British Empire Medal
Royal Australian Navy officers
University of Canterbury alumni
People educated at Christchurch Girls' High School
Women in the Australian military
20th-century Australian women
New Zealand emigrants to Australia
Australian emigrants to the United Kingdom